Richard Wagner (10 April 1952 – 14 March 2023) was a Romanian-born German novelist. He published a number of short stories, novels and essays.

Life and work 
Wagner was a member of one of Romania's German minorities, called Banat Swabians, like his wife, Herta Müller He studied German and Romanian literature at Timișoara University. He then worked as a German language school teacher and as a journalist, and published poetry and short stories in German. He was in 1972 a co-founder and member of the Aktionsgruppe Banat, a German-speaking literary activist society.

In 1987, Wagner and Müller left Romania for West Berlin, to escape communist oppression and censorship in Nicolae Ceaușescu's Romania. They separated in 1989.

Wagner had Parkinson's disease for many years. He died in a Berlin nursery home on 14 March 2023, at age 70.

Publications 
 Klartext. Ein Gedichtbuch (1973)
 die invasion der uhren. Gedichte (1977)
 Der Anfang einer Geschichte. Prosa (1980)
 Hotel California I. Der Tag, der mit einer Wunde begann. Gedichte (1980)
 Anna und die Uhren. Ein Lesebuch für kleine Leute mit Bildern von Cornelia König (1981, 1987)
 Gegenlicht. Gedichte (1983)
 Das Auge des Feuilletons. Geschichten und Notizen. (1984)
 Rostregen. Gedichte. Luchterhand (1986)
 Ausreiseantrag (1988)
 Begrüßungsgeld (1989)
 Die Muren von Wien. Roman. (1990)
 Der Sturz des Tyrannen. Rumänien und das Ende der Diktatur. edited with Helmuth Frauendorfer (1990)
 Sonderweg Rumänien. Bericht aus einem Entwicklungsland. (1991)
 Schwarze Kreide. Gedichte. (1991)
 Völker ohne Signale. Zum Epochenbruch in Osteuropa. Essay (1992)
 Der Himmel von New York im Museum von Amsterdam. Geschichten. (199)
 Heiße Maroni. Gedichte. (1993)
 Giancarlos Koffer (1993)
 Mythendämmerung. Einwürfe eines Mitteleuropäers. (1993)
 Der Mann, der Erdrutsche sammelte. Geschichten. (1994)
 In der Hand der Frauen, novel (1995, DVA) 
 Lisas geheimes Buch, novel (1996)
 Im Grunde sind wir alle Sieger. Roman. (1998)
 Mit Madonna in der Stadt. Gedichte. (2000)
 Miss Bukarest, novel (2001, Aufbau) 
 Ich hatte ein bisschen Kraft drüber, Materialsammlung zu Birgit Vanderbeke von Richard Wagner (2001, S. Fischer TB) 
 Der leere Himmel, Reise in das Innere des Balkan, essay (2003, Aufbau) 
 Habseligkeiten, novel (2004, Aufbau) 
 Der deutsche Horizont. Vom Schicksal eines guten Landes, essay (2006, Aufbau) 
 Das reiche Mädchen, novel (2007, Aufbau) 
 Es reicht. Gegen den Ausverkauf unserer Werte, essay (2008, Aufbau) 
 Linienflug. Gedichte. edited by Ernest Wichner (2010, Hochroth) 
 Belüge mich, novel (2011, Aufbau) 
 Die deutsche Seele, with Thea Dorn. (2011, Knaus) 
 Und meine Seele spannte weit ihre Flügel aus. Hundert deutsche Gedichte. edited, postscript by Richard Wagner (Aufbau, 2013) 
 Habsburg. Bibliothek einer verlorenen Welt (2014, Hoffmann und Campe)

Honours 
 1987 Spezial prize of the Leonce-und-Lena-Preis
 1988 Förderpreis of the Andreas-Gryphius-Preis
 1989 , with Gerhardt Csejka, Helmuth Frauendorfer, Johann Lippet, Herta Müller, Werner Söllner and 
 1990/91 Scholarship of the Villa Massimo
 2000 Literature prize of 
 2008 Georg Dehio Book Prize
 2011 Donauschwäbischer Kulturpreis of Baden-Württemberg, for his life's work
 2014 Verdienstkreuz am Bande des Verdienstordens der Bundesrepublik Deutschland

References

Further reading 
Andrea Mork, Richard Wagner als politischer Schriftsteller: Weltanschauung und Wirkungsgeschichte, Campus, 1990,

External links 
 
 
 
 
 40 Jahre Aktionsgruppe Banat  jahresschrift.blogspot.de, April 2012

1952 births
2023 deaths
German essayists
20th-century German novelists
21st-century German novelists
German schoolteachers
People from Timiș County
Romanian dissidents
Romanian essayists
Romanian novelists
Romanian male writers
German male novelists
Romanian schoolteachers
Romanian anti-communists
Danube-Swabian people
Romanian emigrants to West Germany
German people of German-Romanian descent
German male essayists
20th-century essayists
21st-century essayists
Writers from Berlin
Recipients of the Cross of the Order of Merit of the Federal Republic of Germany